Seodaegu Station is a new railway station on the Gyeongbu high-speed railway newly established in Ihyeon-dong, Seo District, Daegu, South Korea. This station was opened on March 31, 2022.

References 

Korea Train Express stations
Railway stations in Daegu
Dong District, Daegu